Holargos (also: Cholargos) is a suburb of Athens, Greece, located northeast of the city center and about  away from Syntagma Square. Since the 2011 local government reform it is part of the municipality Papagou-Cholargos, of which it is the seat and a municipal unit. The municipal unit has an area of 3.950 km2. The main thoroughfare is Mesogeion Avenue, which connects Cholargos with central Athens and the northern beltway Motorway 6.

Cholargos was the name of a deme of ancient Attica. The most prominent citizen of ancient Cholargos was Pericles. Cholargos was part of the community of Chalandri until 1933, when it became a separate community. It became a municipality in 1963.

Climate 
Cholargos, as most of Attica, features a typical Mediterranean climate with hot, dry summers and cool, wet winters. Because of its location at the base of mountain Hymettus, Cholargos is strongly influenced by cold air masses that travel down the mountain, hence it is cooler that most of Athens, like downtown Athens or seaside locations.

Below is the data for the Nomismatokpeio Station. The station is active since the 1st July 2020, so 2021 is the only year which was registered whole.

The following chart is not highly accurate, since it features only one year of record, but can be used as a guideline.

Historical population

Government and infrastructure 
The headquarters of the Ministry of Infrastructure, Transport and Networks are in Cholargos.

Gallery

See also

List of settlements in Attica
Holargos B.C.

References

External links
 Official website 

Populated places in North Athens (regional unit)